Jaddanbai Hussain (Hindi: जद्दनबाई हुसैन, Punjabi: ਜੱਦਨਬਾਈ ਹੁਸੈਨ,; 1892 – April 8, 1949; known professionally as Jaddanbai) was an Indian singer, music composer, dancer, actress, filmmaker, and one of the pioneers of Indian cinema. She along with Saraswati Devi was one of the first female music composers in Indian cinema. She was the mother of Akhtar Hussain, Anwar Hussain, and the well-known Hindi actress Nargis, and maternal grandmother of Priya Dutt and Sanjay Dutt.

Early life and career 
Jaddanbai Hussain was born around 1892 to Miajaan and Daleepabai, one of chilbila, Meja Allahabad's most renowned dancers. Her mother Daleepabai used to be known as Dilipa Devi and was from a Hindu Brahmin family before being abducted as a child by a wandering group of people who trained and managed dancers. She was thoroughly groomed and went on to be very successful in this profession, working as a singer and dancer. Her managers then arranged her into a marriage with a Sarangi player employed by the troupe whom her mother only knew as Miyan Jaan. Miyan Jaan died when she was five. Jaddanbai moved to the city and became a singer but had difficulty due to her lack of formal training. She later approached Shrimant Ganpat Rao (Bhaiya Saheb Scindia) of Calcutta and became his student. Shrimant Ganpat Rao died in 1920 while she was still a student, so she completed her training under Ustad Moinuddin Khan. Later she also trained with Ustad Chaddu Khan Saheb and Ustad Laab Khan Saheb.

Her music became popular and she became an even more famous courtesan than her mother. She began recording ghazals with the Columbia Gramophone Company. She started participating in music sessions and was invited by the rulers of many princely states such as Rampur, Bikaner, Gwalior, Jammu and Kashmir, Indore, and Jodhpur to perform mehfils. She had also rendered songs and ghazals at various radio stations nationwide.

She later began acting when the Play Art Photo Tone Company of Lahore approached her for a role in their movie Raja Gopichand in 1933. She played the role of the mother of the title character. Later she worked for a Karachi based film company, in Insaan ya Shaitan.

She worked in two more movies, Prem Pariksha and Seva Sadan, before starting her own production company called Sangeet Films. The company produced Talashe Haq in 1935, in which she acted and composed the music. She also introduced her daughter Nargis as a child artist. In 1936 she acted in, directed, and wrote the music for Madam Fashion.

Personal life
Her first marriage was with a wealthy Gujarati Hindu businessman Narottamdas ("Bachhubhai" or "Bachi Babu") Khatri. Khatri converted to Islam upon marriage and together they had a son, Akhtar Hussain. Her second marriage was with harmonium master Ustaad Irshad Meer Khan, a frequent collaborator, who sired her second son, actor Anwar Hussain. Her third marriage was to Mohanchand Uttamchand ("Mohan Babu") Tyagi, a wealthy Punjabi Mohyal Brahmin Hindu heir who converted to Islam and adopted the name Abdul Rashid. Film actress Nargis (née Fatima Rashid) was their daughter.

Despite being a nominal Muslim and her husband formally converting to Islam, Jaddanbai and her family practiced aspects of Hinduism, fluctuating between a Hindu and Muslim identity. Jaddanbai was sometimes known by the alias "Jayadevi Tyagi," a Hindu name, even in some official documents. She is the mother-in-law of Sunil Dutt and grandmother of Priya and Sanjay Dutt.

Filmography (as director) 
 Madam Fashion (1936)
 Hriday Manthan (1936)
 Moti Ka Haar (1937)
 Jeevan Swapna (1937)

See also 
 Tawaif
 Nautch

References

External links 
 

1892 births
1949 deaths
Artists from Allahabad
Indian women classical singers
Indian film actresses
Indian women film producers
Film producers from Uttar Pradesh
Year of birth uncertain
Artists from Varanasi
Hindi film score composers
20th-century Indian composers
20th-century Indian actresses
20th-century Indian women singers
20th-century Indian women musicians
Women musicians from Uttar Pradesh
20th-century Indian singers
Actresses from Varanasi
Musicians from Varanasi
Indian women playback singers
Indian women composers
Businesswomen from Uttar Pradesh
20th-century Indian businesswomen
20th-century Indian businesspeople
20th-century women composers